Sumner Glacier is a short, broad tributary glacier that flows northeast into the lower reaches of Weyerhaeuser Glacier, close west of Mount Solus, in southern Graham Land. Sketched from the air by D.P. Mason of Falkland Islands Dependencies Survey (FIDS) in August 1947. The lower reaches only were surveyed from the ground by FIDS in December 1958. Named by United Kingdom Antarctic Place-Names Committee (UK-APC) after Thomas H. Sumner (1807–76), American sailor who, in 1837, introduced the position line method of navigation, since developed into standard practice at sea and in the air.

See also
Eisner Peak

References

Glaciers of Graham Land
Bowman Coast